Anjo Yllana is a Filipino actor-comedian, television host and politician.

Career
Yllana started in show business in 1984 with talent manager the late Douglas Quijano. He then auditioned for the teen TV variety show That's Entertainment after attempting a career as a professional basketball player.  He started with support roles in both comedy and drama.  He was nominated by different award-giving bodies as Best Supporting Actor in the movie Itanong Mo sa Buwan, starring opposite Jaclyn Jose and directed by Chito S. Roño.

His turning point in show business came in 1991, when he was given the role of Dino Tengco, the mentally disabled son of the crazy politician couple Barbara and Anding Tengco in the ABS-CBN satirical sitcom Abangan Ang Susunod Na Kabanata.  He was awarded Best Comedy Actor by Star Awards in 1992 for his efforts.  He was subsequently launched as a solo comedian and had several successful comedy films to his name, among them Dino, Abangan ang Susunod Na... (his launching movie), Pempe ni Sara at Pen (with Kris Aquino and Vandolph) and Milyonaryong Mini (with John Estrada and Sheryl Cruz).  He also became part of the sitcoms Ober da Bakod (GMA Network) and Palibhasa Lalake (ABS-CBN).  His stint in the latter sitcom cost him his role in Ober da Bakod after he decided to become an exclusive ABS-CBN talent.

After Abangan Ang Susunod Na Kabanata ended its run, Anjo turned to TV directing via the GMA Network sitcom M.U.? which starred his brother Jomari Yllana as well as Gelli de Belen.  Soon after, in 1999, he moved to GMA Network after ending his contract with ABS-CBN and started hosting the long-running noontime show Eat Bulaga!  His former comic tandem with Janno Gibbs in Ober da Bakod was revived via Beh Bote Nga (1999-2003) and Nuts Entertainment (2003-2007).  They also appeared together in Eat Bulaga! until Janno resigned from the show to start acting in GMA soap operas.  His last solo TV show was Cool Center where he formed a hilarious tandem with Eugene Domingo from 2008 to 2009.

In 2020, Anjo finally resigned from the show "Eat Bulaga" after 21 years due to the COVID-19 pandemic.  With no other shows from his former network GMA-7, Yllana accepted Net25's offer as the lead host of the UHF network's first noontime comedy variety program, "Happy Time". with co hosts former Dabarkads host & comedian Kitkat and former That's Entertainment mainstay and former Dabarkads host comedian Janno Gibbs.  The show also served as the reunion of Anjo & Janno tandem since "Ober Da Bakod", "Beh Bote Nga", "Nuts Entertainment" & "Eat Bulaga".  As of 2021, Anjo was cancelled/terminated in the show due to bullying (again) incident with new hosts.

Political career
Yllana started ventured into politics in 1998 when he ran and won as city councilor of the lone district of Parañaque. He was reelected in 2001 and served for a total of two terms before seeking higher office. In 2004, he ran and won the Vice Mayoralty race in the same city. In 2007, he lost in his bid for reelection to Gustavo Tambunting. In 2010, he ran once again for vice mayor under the banner of Pwersa ng Masang Pilipino and as the running mate of Eduardo Zialcita, but lost.

In 2013, he ran for city councilor, this time in the newly created 5th district of Quezon City, which includes his home barangay Fairview. He was successfully reelected in 2016.

Yllana then transferred to Tinambac, Camarines Sur and on October 4, 2021, he filed his certificate of candidacy to run for representative of the province's 4th district in 2022. However, he withdrew from the race in November 2021, citing his health following his diagnosis with COVID-19 and money issues. He was reportedly substituted by comedian and former San Jose Mayor Tony Chavez, who would then go on to lose the race to incumbent Arnie Fuentebella.

Organizations
Member of Scouts Royale Brotherhood (SRB)

Filmography

TV series
Lovingly Yours Helen (GMA Network, 1987–1996)
Kalatog Pinggan (ABS-CBN 1987–1989)
Maricel Regal Drama Special (ABS-CBN, 1987)
Young Love, Sweet Love (RPN 9, 1989–1993)
Takeshi's Castle (IBC, 1991–1992)
B Na B: Baliw Na Baliw Game Show (ABC, now TV5, 1992–1993)
Alabang Girls The Comedy Series (TV5, 1992–1994)
Tondominium (ABC, now TV5, 1994–1995)
Maalaala Mo Kaya: Payaso (1992)
Abangan Ang Susunod Na Kabanata (ABS-CBN, 1991–1997) 
Palibhasa Lalake (ABS-CBN, 1990, 1993–1998) 
Ober Da Bakod (GMA Network, 1992–1997) 
Eat Bulaga! (GMA Network, 1999–2020)
Beh Bote Nga (GMA Network, 1999–2003)
Magpakailanman: The Efren "Bata" Reyes Story (GMA Network, 2004)
Nuts Entertainment (GMA Network, 2004–2009) 
Maynila (GMA Network, 2005)
Cool Center (GMA Network, 2009–2010)
Talentadong Pinoy (TV5, 2010)
Swerte Swerte Lang (TV5, 2011)
Pidol's Wonderland (TV5, 2012)
Toda Max (ABS-CBN, 2013) - guest as "Dino Tengco"
Gandang Gabi, Vice! (ABS-CBN, 2013) - guest with the cast of Palibhasa Lalake Reunion
Vampire ang Daddy Ko (GMA Network, 2013–2016)
Pangalawang Bukas: 2014 Eat Bulaga Holy Week Drama Specials (GMA Network, April 16, 2014)
Pangako ng Pag-ibig: 2015 Eat Bulaga Lenten Special (GMA Network, March 30, 2015)
Sabado Badoo (GMA Network, 2015) - cameo footage featured
Dear Uge (GMA Network, 2016)
Hay, Bahay! (GMA Network, 2017)
Full House Tonight (GMA Network, 2017)
Celebrity Bluff (GMA Network, 2018)
Daddy's Gurl (GMA Network, 2018)
The Boobay and Tekla Show (GMA Network, 2019)
Mars Pa More (GMA Network, 2019)
Ilaban Natin Yan! (GMA Network, 2020)
Chika Besh (TV5, 2020)
Happy Time (Net 25, 2020–2021)
Rolling In It Philippines (TV5, 2021)

FilmWill You Marry (2021)My Bebe Love: #KiligPaMore (2015)Separados (2014)My Little Bossings (2013)Pak! Pak! My Dr. Kwak! (2011)Enteng Kabisote: OK Ka Fairy Ko... The Legend (2004) - PandoyHari ng Yabang (1997) VicIsa, Dalawa, Takbo! (1996) - EstingMilyonaryong Mini (1996)Ober Da Bakod 2: Da Treasure Adbentyur (1996)Siyempre Ikaw Lang...: Ang Syota Kong Imported (1996)Best Friends (1995)Pulis Patola 2 (1995) - Matipid/Kuya LotpuSi Ayala at si Zobel (1995) - AyalaChick Boy (1994) - RaffyOber Da Bakod: The Movie (1994)Sobra Talaga... Over! (1994)Pulis Patola (1993)Dino, Abangan ang Susunod Na... (1993) - DinoGagay: Prinsesa ng Brownout (1993) - PaulMamas Boys: Mga Praning-ning (1993)Guwapings: The First Adventure (1992) - BuddyMahirap Maging Pogi (1992)Alabang Girls (1992)Dobol Dribol (1992)Estribo Gang: The Jinggoy Sese Story (1992)Mahal, Saan Ka Natulog Kagabi? (1992)Pretty Boy (1992)Pitong Gamol (1991)Da Young Asiong Aksaya (1991)Joey Boy Munti: 15 Anyos Ka sa Muntinglupa (1991) - BoyongShake, Rattle & Roll II ("Aswang" segment) (1990)Flavor of the Month (1990)Regal Shocker: The Movie ("Pangako" segment) (1989)Isang Araw Walang Diyos (1989) Rosenda (1989) Kapag Napagod ang Puso (1988) Tagos ng Dugo (1987)Once Upon a Time (1987) - Benny Super Islaw and the Flying Kids'' (1986)

Awards
Winner, Best Comedy Actor - 1992 PMPC Star Awards For TV

See also
Jomari Yllana

References

External links

Living people
Bicolano actors
Bicolano people
Bicolano politicians
Filipino actor-politicians
Filipino male comedians
Filipino male film actors
Filipino people of Spanish descent
GMA Network personalities
Male actors from Metro Manila
Metro Manila city and municipal councilors
People from Parañaque
People from Quezon City
Quezon City Council members
That's Entertainment (Philippine TV series)